Rockport is a town in Knox County, Maine, United States. It is thirty-five miles southeast of Augusta. The population was 3,644 at the 2020 census. Rockport is a popular tourist destination and art colony.

History

Rockport, or "the River", was settled in 1769 by Robert Thorndike. Goose River Village (as it was known until 1852) was originally part of the Megunticook Plantation, incorporated in 1791 as Camden. Shipbuilding, ice harvesting and the manufacture of lime were important early industries. In 1817, three hundred casks of lime were sent to Washington, DC for use in the rebuilding of the United States Capitol, which had been damaged by the British during the War of 1812. In 1852, the citizens of Goose River voted to change their village's name to Rockport for its rocky terrain. On February 25, 1891, Rockport officially split from Camden because of a dispute over the cost of constructing a bridge. The town of Rockport was born and from Camden it took half the population, three quarters of the land, and most importantly the profitable lime and ice industries.

Rockport has a longstanding reputation as an artists' community, with notable artists and art institutions playing a significant role in the town's economic and social life. Bay Chamber Concerts was established in 1961 as a continuation of the summer music instruction of the Curtis Institute. Mary Louise Curtis Bok, central to founding both Bay Chamber Concerts and the Curtis Institute, was one of the largest landowners in Rockport, and has been credited with playing a vital role in significantly improving the landscaping of the village's inner harbor. At one time she owned most of the eastern shore of the harbor. Mary Lea Park, adjacent to the Rockport Opera House, is named in honor of both her and Rockport resident and violinist Lea Luboshutz.

Rockport was the home of Andre the Seal, a seal adopted by the Goodridge family in 1961, and who was a significant tourist attraction in Rockport Harbor until his death in 1986. The seal's "owner" Harry Goodridge co-wrote a book about Andre, titled A Seal Called Andre. The 1994 film Andre was adapted from the book, although in the movie Andre is actually played by a sea lion, not a seal. A statue of Andre sits beside the harbor in his honor. Rockport is also known for its Belted Galloway cattle. The cattle are raised at the 136-acre Aldermere Farm, which is owned and operated by the Maine Coast Heritage Trust, a statewide land conservation organization. The Belted Galloways remain one of the area's most popular attractions, and are often referred to as the "Oreo cookie" cows.

The 1993 Warner Bros. film The Man Without a Face, starring Mel Gibson, Universal's 1995 film Casper and Miramax's 2001 film In the Bedroom were filmed in Rockport.

In 2008, Forbes magazine placed Rockport at the top of its list of the prettiest towns in America.

Geography

Drained by Varnah Brook and Goose River, Rockport is located beside Penobscot Bay and the Gulf of Maine, part of the Atlantic Ocean.

The town is crossed by U. S. Route 1 and state routes 17 and 90. It borders the towns of Rockland to the south, Warren to the southwest, Union to the west, Hope to the northwest, and Camden to the north.

Climate

This climatic region is typified by large seasonal temperature differences, with warm to hot (and often humid) summers and cold (sometimes severely cold) winters. According to the Köppen Climate Classification system, Rockport has a humid continental climate, abbreviated "Dfb" on climate maps.

Demographics

2010 census

As of the census of 2010, there were 3,330 people, 1,422 households, and 967 families residing in the town. The racial makeup of the town was 97.6% White, 0.3% African American, 0.5% Native American, 0.4% Asian, and 1.2% from two or more races. Hispanic or Latino of any race were 1.1% of the population.

There were 1,422 households, of which 27.7% had children under the age of 18 living with them, 56.1% were married couples living together, 8.7% had a female householder with no husband present, 3.2% had a male householder with no wife present, and 32.0% were non-families. 25.6% of all households were made up of individuals, and 10.5% had someone living alone who was 65 years of age or older. The average household size was 2.34 and the average family size was 2.80.

The median age in the town was 48.8 years. 22% of residents were under the age of 18; 4.5% were between the ages of 18 and 24; 17.8% were from 25 to 44; 35.8% were from 45 to 64; and 19.9% were 65 years of age or older. The gender makeup of the town was 48.2% male and 51.8% female.

2000 census

In the 2000 census, there were 3,209 people, 1,373 households and 918 families in the town. The racial makeup was 98.69% White, 0.16% African American, 0.06% Native American, 0.44% Asian, 0.19% from other races, and 0.47% from two or more races. Hispanic or Latino of any race were 0.75% of the population.

There were 1,373 households, of which 29.6% had children under 18 living with them, 56.2% were married couples living together, 8.2% had a female householder with no husband present, and 33.1% were non-families. 27.7% of all households were made up of individuals, and 11.5% had someone living alone who was 65 years of age or older. The average household size was 2.33 and the average family size was 2.83.

In the town, the population was spread out, with 23.5% under 18, 5.0% from 18 to 24, 25.3% from 25 to 44, 28.9% from 45 to 64, and 17.3% who were 65 or older. The median age was 43. For every 100 females, there were 91.7 males. For every 100 females 18 and over, there were 89.0 males.

The median income for a household in the town was $47,155, and the median for a family $56,068. Males had a median of $35,865 versus $25,542 for females. The per capita income for the town was $25,498. About 5.4% of families and 7.1% of the population were below the poverty line, including 10.2% of those under 18 and 7.3% of those 65 or over.

Gallery

Sites of interest

 Aldermere Farm—Maine Coast Heritage Trust
 Bay Chamber Concerts
 Camden Area History Center
 Camden-Rockport Historical Society
 Center for Maine Contemporary Art
 Indian Island Light
 Maine Media Workshops
 Rockport Opera House

Education

 Maine School Administrative District 28 operates K–8 schools
 Camden Hills Regional High School

Notable people

 Stephen Bowen, state legislator and Commissioner of Education under Paul LePage
 Gabriel Byrne, Irish actor, lives here
 Lew Dietz, writer
 Andre the Seal
 Harry Goodridge, author
 T. Allen Lawson, artist
 Thomas Tertius Noble, English organist and composer, died here
 Bidu Sayão, Brazilian soprano singer, lived and died here
 Ada Bampton Tremaine, philanthropist
 Molly White (writer), software engineer, Wikipedia editor, and crypto skeptic

References

External links 

 Town of Rockport, Maine
 Rockport Public Library
 Chamber of Commerce
 Samoset Resort
 History of The Samoset Hotel
 Maine Genealogy: Rockport, Knox County, Maine
 Rockport How Things Used To Be – Life In Maine. 

 
Towns in Knox County, Maine
Populated coastal places in Maine